Complex metal hydrides are salts wherein the anions contain hydrides.  In the older chemical literature as well as contemporary materials science textbooks, a "metal hydride" is assumed to be nonmolecular, i.e. three-dimensional lattices of atomic ions.  In such systems, hydrides are often interstitial and nonstoichiometric, and the bonding between the metal and hydrogen atoms is significantly ionic.  In contrast, complex metal hydrides typically contain more than one type of metal or metalloid and may be soluble but invariably react with water.  They exhibit ionic bonding between a positive metal ion with molecular anions containing the hydride.  In such materials the hydrogen is bonded with significant covalent character to the second metal or metalloid atoms.

Examples
In general, complex metal hydrides have the formula MxM'yHn, where M is an alkali metal cation or cation complex and M' is a metal or metalloid.  Well known examples feature group 13 elements, especially boron and aluminium including sodium aluminium hydride, NaAlH4 ), lithium aluminum hydride, LiAlH4, and lithium borohydride, (LiBH4).  Complex metal hydrides are often soluble in etherial solvents.  Other complex metal hydrides are numerous.  Illustrative examples include the salts [MgBr(THF)2]4FeH6 and K2ReH9.

See also 
Ionic hydrides
Hydrogen storage

References

Metal hydrides
Inorganic chemistry
Hydrogen storage